The Garcia River Forest is a  forest located in Mendocino County, California, about  north of San Francisco. It is owned and managed by The Conservation Fund. The fund generates  credits by logging a portion of the forest less intensely than is allowed under California law. These credits are sold to PG&E which retires them on behalf of customers enrolled in its ClimateSmart program. PG&E's ClimateSmart program is a program where customers voluntarily pay more on their utility bill to offset a percentage of their GHG emissions.

The California Climate Action Registry (CCAR) conducts and monitors The Garcia River Forest Project in order to restore forests to reduce global warming.

References

External links

Forests of California
Protected areas of Mendocino County, California